The Chautauqua Prize is an annual American literary award established by the Chautauqua Institution in 2012. The winner receives  and all travel and expenses for a one-week summer residency at Chautauqua. It is a "national prize that celebrates a book of fiction or literary/narrative nonfiction that provides a richly rewarding reading experience and honors the author for a significant contribution to the literary arts."

Winners and runners-up
2012:  Andrew Krivak, The Sojourn
Geraldine Brooks, Caleb's Crossing
Erik Larson, In the Garden of Beasts
Nathaniel Philbrick, Why Read Moby-Dick?
Leonard Rosen, All Cry Chaos
Stephanie Powell Watts, We Are Taking Only What We Need
2013:  Timothy Egan, Short Nights of the Shadow Catcher
Ben Fountain, Billy Lynn's Long Halftime Walk
Nancy Gibbs and Michael Duffy, The Presidents Club
Gilbert King, Devil in the Grove
Madeline Miller, The Song of Achilles
John Colman Wood, The Names of Things
2014:  Elizabeth Scarboro, My Foreign Cities
Louise Aronson, A History of the Present Illness: Stories
Lindsay Hill, Sea of Hooks
Roger Rosenblatt, The Boy Detective: A New York Childhood
James Tobin, The Man He Became: How FDR Defied Polio to Win the Presidency
Margaret Wrinkle, Wash
2015:  Phil Klay, Redeployment
Michael Blanding, The Map Thief
Kim Church, Byrd
Brian Hart, The Bully of Order
Lily King, Euphoria
Jason Sokol, All Eyes Are Upon Us
Bilal Tanweer, The Scatter Here Is Too Great
Jean Thompson, The Witch
2016:  Cyrus Copeland, Off the Radar: A Father's Secret, a Mother's Heroism, and a Son's Quest
Lynsey Addario, It's What I Do: A Photographer's Life of Love and War
Lenore Myka, King of the Gypsies: Stories
Steven Niteingale, Granada: A Pomegranate in the Hand of God
Susan Southard, Nagasaki: Life After Nuclear War
2017:  Peter Ho Davies, The Fortunes
H. W. Brands, The General vs. The President: MacArthur and Truman at the Brink of Nuclear War
Victoria Pope Hubbell, Blood River Rising: The Thompson-Crimson Feud of the 1920s 
Ben H. Winters, Underground Airlines
Colin Woodard, American Character: A History of the Epic Struggle Between Individual Liberty and the Common Good
Kao Kalia Yang, The Song Poet: A Memoir of My Father
2018:  Alex Marzano-Lesnevich, The Fact of a Body: A Murder and a Memoir
Hala Alyan, Salt Houses
Glenn Frankel, High Noon: The Hollywood Blacklist and the Making of an American Classic 
Anne Gisleson, The Futilitarians: Our Year of Thinking, Drinking, Grieving, and Reading
Meg Howrey, The Wanderers
Andrew Krivák, The Signal Flame
Dalia Rosenfeld, The Worlds We Think We Know
2019:  Anjali Sachdeva, All the Names They Used For God
Edward Carey, Little
Ken Krimstein, The Three Escapes of Hannah Arendt: A Tyranny of Truth 
Kiese Laymon, Heavy: An American Memoir
Richard Powers, The Overstory
Elizabeth Rush, Rising: Dispatches from the New American Shore
Elizabeth H. Winthrop, The Mercy Seat
2020:  Petina Gappah, Out of Darkness, Shining Light 
Mikhal Dekel, Tehran Children: A Holocaust Refugee Odyssey
Carolyn Forché, What You Have Heard is True: A Memoir of Witness and Resistance 
Myla Goldberg, Feast Your Eyes
Isabella Hammad, The Parisian
Imani Perry, Breathe: A Letter to My Sons
Pitchaya Sudbanthad, Bangkok Wakes to Rain

References

External links
The Chautauqua Prize, official website.

Awards established in 2012
2012 establishments in New York (state)
American fiction awards
American non-fiction literary awards